German submarine U-150 was a Type IID U-boat of Nazi Germany's Kriegsmarine during World War II. Her keel was laid down on 25 May 1940 by Deutsche Werke in Kiel as yard number 279. She was launched on 19 October 1940 and commissioned on 27 November with Hinrich Kelling in command.

U-146 began her service life with the 1st U-boat Flotilla. She was then assigned to the 22nd flotilla and subsequently to the 31st flotilla. She spent the war as a training vessel.

Design
German Type IID submarines were enlarged versions of the original Type IIs. U-150 had a displacement of  when at the surface and  while submerged. She had two shafts and two  propellers.

U-150 was fitted with three  torpedo tubes at the bow, five torpedoes or up to twelve Type A torpedo mines, and a  anti-aircraft gun. The boat had a complement of 25.

Fate
She was surrendered at the German island of Heligoland on 5 May 1945, taken to Loch Ryan in Scotland and sunk by gunfire from the destroyer  and the patrol sloop  as part of Operation Deadlight on 21 December 1945.

References

Bibliography

External links

German Type II submarines
U-boats commissioned in 1940
World War II submarines of Germany
1940 ships
Ships built in Kiel
Operation Deadlight
U-boats sunk in 1945
U-boats sunk by British warships
Maritime incidents in December 1945